Bergens Sparebank was a Norwegian savings bank based in Bergen. It was established in 1823, making it the second-oldest savings bank in Norway and the oldest in Bergen. It merged with 25 savings banks in 1982 to become Sparebanken Vest.

References

Defunct banks of Norway
Companies based in Bergen
Mutual savings banks in Norway
1982 disestablishments in Norway
Banks established in 1823
Banks disestablished in 1982
Norwegian companies established in 1823